Brāhmaṇa was an ancient Indo-Aryan tribe of north-eastern South Asia whose existence is attested during the Iron Age.

Location
The territory of the Brāhmaṇas was located near Magadha, and their neighbours were the Buli tribe of Allakappa.

The capital city of the Brāhmaṇas was named in Pali alternatively Veṭhadīpa​ (Viṣṇudvīpa​ in Sanskrit) or Doṇagāma (Droṇagāma in Sanskrit).

History
After the Buddha's death, the Brāhmaṇas of Veṭhadīpa-Doṇagāma were given a share of his relics.

Political and social organisation

References

Sources

 

Ancient peoples of India
Ancient peoples of Nepal